The 1978 UK Athletics Championships was the national championship in outdoor track and field for the United Kingdom held at Meadowbank Stadium, Edinburgh.

It was the second edition of the competition limited to British athletes only, launched as an alternative to the AAA Championships, which was open to foreign competitors. However, due to the fact that the calibre of national competition remained greater at the AAA event, the UK Championships this year were not considered the principal national championship event by some statisticians, such as the National Union of Track Statisticians (NUTS). Many of the athletes below also competed at the 1978 AAA Championships.

Sonia Lannaman defended her 100 metres/200 metres sprint double from 1977. Allan Wells took his first sprint double on the men's side and Jane Colebrook managed a double in the 400 metres and 800 metres. Athletes to retain their titles from 1977 included Lannaman, sprint hurdlers Berwyn Price and Sharon Colyear, Geoff Capes (men's shot put), Meg Ritchie (women's discus) and Tessa Sanderson (women's javelin).

The main international track and field competition for the United Kingdom that year was the 1978 European Athletics Championships. Two athletes at the UK event won individual medals at European level: the men's 800 m champion Sebastian Coe was a European bronze medallist and women's javelin throw champion Sanderson was European runner-up. The top three in the UK women's 200 m (Beverley Goddard, Kathy Smallwood, and Lannaman) plus hurdles champion Colyear teamed up to take a 4 × 100 metres relay European silver.

The four countries of the United Kingdom competed separately at the Commonwealth Games that year as well, and UK champions who won there were Wells, Price, Lannaman, Capes, Sanderson, Paula Fudge (3000 m), Sue Reeve (long jump). The same relay quartet of the European Championships also took the Commonwealth Games title for England.

Medal summary

Men

Women

References

UK Athletics Championships
UK Outdoor Championships
Athletics Outdoor
Sports competitions in Edinburgh
Athletics competitions in Scotland